A.E. Pontion Vatolakkos F.C. is a Greek football club, based in Vatolakkos, Grevena.

Honors

Domestic Titles and honors
 Eps Grevena Champions: 1
 2015-16
 Eps Grevena Cup Winners: 2
 2014-15, 2015-16

Football clubs in Central Macedonia
Grevena (regional unit)
Association football clubs established in 1981
1981 establishments in Greece
Gamma Ethniki clubs